Valeria Solovieva and Lenka Wienerová were the defending champions, but Wienerová chose not to participate.
Solovieva partnered up with Sally Peers, but lost in the first round to Alexa Glatch and Melanie Oudin.

Eugenie Bouchard and Jessica Pegula won the title, defeating Sharon Fichman and Marie-Ève Pelletier in the final, 6–4, 4–6, [10–5].

Seeds

Draw

Draw

References
 Main Draw

Dothan Pro Tennis Classic - Doubles
Hardee's Pro Classic